Juwuane "JuJu" Hughes (born July 19, 1998) is an American football safety for the Arizona Cardinals of the National Football League (NFL). He played college football at Fresno State.

Early life and high school
Hughes was born in Lemoore, California and grew up in Hanford, California and attended Hanford High School, where he played basketball and football as a defensive back, wide receiver and returner. He missed the first six games of his senior year due to a broken arm finished the season with eight receptions for 175 yards, including a 77-yard touchdown reception. Hughes committed to play college football at Fresno State over an offer from San Diego State.

College career
Hughes was a member of the Fresno State Bulldogs for four seasons. As a junior, Hughes was named second-team All-Mountain West Conference after recording 78 tackles with eight passes defended and a conference-leading four interceptions. He had 80 tackles, seven passes defended and two tackles and was named honorable mention All-Mountain West. Hughes finished his collegiate career with 247 tackles, 28 passes defended and seven touchdowns in 52 games played.

Professional career

Los Angeles Rams
Hughes was signed by the Los Angeles Rams as an undrafted free agent following the 2020 NFL Draft on April 26, 2020. He was waived on September 4, 2020, during final roster cuts, and was subsequently signed to the team's practice squad two days later. The Rams elevated Hughes to the active roster on October 3, 2020, and he made his NFL debut the following day in a 17–9 win over the New York Giants. He reverted to the practice squad after the game, and he was promoted to the team's active roster on October 13, 2020. He was waived on January 8, 2022.

Detroit Lions
On January 10, 2022, Hughes was claimed off waivers by the Detroit Lions. He made the Lions final roster, playing in seven games before being waived on November 19, 2022.

Arizona Cardinals
On November 23, 2022, the Arizona Cardinals signed Hughes to their practice squad. He signed a reserve/future contract on January 11, 2023.

References

External links
Fresno State Bulldogs bio
Los Angeles Rams bio

1998 births
Living people
21st-century African-American sportspeople
African-American players of American football
People from Hanford, California
Players of American football from California
American football safeties
Fresno State Bulldogs football players
Los Angeles Rams players
Detroit Lions players
Arizona Cardinals players